Ken Kilrea may refer to:

 Ken Kilrea (ice hockey) (1919–1990), Canadian ice hockey player
 Ken Kilrea (Canadian football) (1940–2008), Canadian football player